Andrew Tolman (born January 9, 1986) is an American studio musician and songwriter. He is a member of the cult club band The Moth & The Flame. He was also a founding member of the pop rock band Imagine Dragons. In 2016–17, Andrew went on tour with Mondo Cozmo as part of the backing band along with Drew Beck, Chris Null, and James Gordon.

Career

Imagine Dragons (2008–2011)
Tolman's drumming can be heard on Imagine Dragons' first four EPs, Speak to Me (2008), Imagine Dragons (2009), Hell and Silence (2010), and It's Time (2011) along with his wife Brittany on keyboards and backing vocals. He and Brittany play on multiple songs from their debut album, Night Visions (2012), including multi-platinum single "It's Time" (US #15, UK #23).

In 2018, Andrew and Brittany, re-joined Imagine Dragons during a show in Las Vegas for one song.

In 2023, Tolman replaced Imagine Dragons’ Daniel Platzman on the drums for four shows of the Mercury World Tour.

The Moth & The Flame (2012–present) 
Tolman's drumming can be heard on The Moth & The Flame's first EP entitled & EP (2013) which was produced by Joey Waronker (Beck, Atoms for Peace, R.E.M.) and released via Hidden Records.  A second EP entitled Young & Unafraid EP was released via Elektra Records and produced by Peter Katis (The National, Interpol), Tony Hoffer (M83, Beck), and Nate Pyfer (Parlor Hawk, Fictionist).  It included the single "Young & Unafraid" that reached #37 on the Billboard Alternative Songs chart.

Additional features
Tolman is a studio drummer for Mount Saint, an indie pop group fronted by his wife, also a former member of Imagine Dragons.

In 2016, Andrew and wife Brittany released a first single "Chaperone" for new alt pop duo Tolman.

Equipment
Andrew endorses C&C Custom Drum Company and Istanbul Agop cymbals.

Education 
Andrew is a graduate of Caleb Chapman's Soundhouse, a musician training program headquartered in Utah, and a former member of its flagship group, Caleb Chapman's Crescent Super Band.  He also studied music at Brigham Young University.

References

American drummers
Living people
Imagine Dragons members
1986 births
Musicians from Utah
People from American Fork, Utah
Songwriters from Utah
American male songwriters
21st-century American drummers
Caleb Chapman's Crescent Super Band members